José Dias Ferreira, GCTE (30 November 1837, in Arganil,  – 8 September 1909, in Vidago) was a Portuguese lawyer, politician and jurist, son of António Ferreira Dias (São Martinho, Urgueira, c. 1815 – Aldeia Nova, 27 August 1880) and wife Bernarda Pereira de Vasconcelos (c. 1810 – ?).

He served as a Minister, 18th (4 January 1868), 27th (26 May 1870) and 48th (27 May 1892) Minister for Treasury Affairs and Prime Minister of Portugal from 1892 to 1893 and was the country's most influential civil law scholar during the late 19th century. He was also the 250th Grand Cross of the Order of the Tower and Sword.

References

External link

1837 births
1909 deaths
People from Arganil
Prime Ministers of Portugal
Finance ministers of Portugal
Portuguese jurists
19th-century Portuguese people
Recipients of the Order of the Tower and Sword